İsmail Kerem Alışık (born 5 June 1960) is a Turkish actor and television presenter. He is the only son of famous actors of Turkish cinema Sadri Alışık and Çolpan İlhan. Between 1988 and 1993, he was married to actress Sibel Turnagöl. He has appeared in many Turkish series and movies. He is known for his directorship and production of Savaş Ay and the film The Belly Dancer (Dansöz). Most recently he has appeared on the TV series Ben Onu Çok Sevdim.

Filmography

References

External links 
 

1960 births
Male actors from Istanbul
Turkish male film actors
Living people
20th-century Turkish male actors
Television people from Istanbul